Boss Ko (14 October 1974 – 24 December 2021) was a Burmese politician who served as acting Chief Minister of Kayah State, Minister of Agriculture, Livestock and Irrigation for Kayah State and Kayah State Parliament MP  for Demoso Township Constituency No. 2.

Early life and education
Boss Ko was born on 14 October 1974 in Puphar village, Demoso, Kayah State, Myanm  to parents U Thung and Mushi. He finished high school in Loikaw.

Political career
He was a member of the National League for Democracy Party. In the 2015 Myanmar general election, he contested the Demoso Township constituency No. 2 for Kayah State Parliament and won a seat. He was appointed Minister of Agriculture, Livestock and Irrigation for Kayah State on 7 April 2016, and acting Chief Minister on 3 September 2020 by President Win Myint, after chief minister L Phaung Sho was relieved from post. He served until the 2021 Myanmar coup d'état. He was detained by the military council after the military coup.

Later life and death
Ko died on 24 December 2021, at the age of 47 after he escaped from prison.

References 

1974 births
2021 deaths
Government ministers of Myanmar
National League for Democracy politicians
Region or state chief ministers of Myanmar
People from Kayah State